Carlos Moncayo (Simplified Chinese 卡罗斯) is an Ecuadorian businessman best known for being co-founder and CEO of Asiam Business Group.

Early life 
Moncayo was born in Quito, Ecuador. He studied law at the Catholic University of Ecuador but took a break from his education to start Asiam Business Group. Despite not completing his undergraduate studies, he was admitted and received his MBA from Kellogg - HKUST Business School, being the first candidate to be admitted in this program without an undergraduate degree. Besides attending Kellogg he has also attended Willamette University, Stanford Graduate School of Business, CEIBS (China Europe International Business School) and Yale University.

Career 
In 2003, Moncayo co-founded, with his two brothers Luis Moncayo and Fernando Moncayo, Asiam Business Group, a boutique offshore manufacturing management company headquartered in China with sourcing offices in Vietnam, India and Pakistan. Moncayo now serves as CEO of Asiam Business Group. He is also co-founder and director of Startups Ventures, an organization that supports the education, networking and finance of entrepreneurs in Ecuador. In 2015, Carlos along with his brothers founded the SaaS company Inspectorio. He serves as the CEO of the company.

He has been featured or quoted in media outlets including Financial Times and BBC News.

Accomplishments 
Moncayo was selected as Asia’s Best Young Entrepreneur in 2009 by BusinessWeek magazine readers. being the first non-Asian to receive this honor. He was also named Business Man of the Year by the Ecuadorian Chinese Chamber of Commerce in 2009.
 
Moncayo is the youngest permanent member of the World Entrepreneurship Forum, an invitation-only global think tank under the patronage of French President Nicolas Sarkozy where 100 prominent entrepreneurs, academicians and political decision makers from across the globe offer recommendations on how to foster entrepreneurship.

In 2010, he was selected New York City Venture Fellow, a program founded by New York City Mayor, Michael Bloomberg, targeted towards assisting rising international entrepreneurs to develop scalable businesses with global impact. He is the youngest Latin American CEO to join the G-50 (Grupo de los Cincuenta) forum. In 2012, he was named Young Global Leader by the World Economic Forum.

Moncayo has also been featured on Ideas Exchange, a series from the BBC that pairs up business leaders from around the world to discuss the business landscape and their secrets to success. He was paired on an episode with Argentine-Spanish entrepreneur Martin Varsavsky.

References 

Ecuadorian chief executives
Chinese businesspeople
Ecuadorian people of Chinese descent
Living people
People from Quito
1981 births